General elections were held in Liechtenstein in April and May 1878. New elections were called after the Landtag was dissolved as part of the compromise between the representatives of the Oberland and Unterland regions during the 1877 general election.

Starting from this election, Landtag members were elected to represent their electoral districts and not Liechtenstein as a whole. The country was divided into two electoral districts; Oberland (with seven seats) and Unterland (with five seats).

Electors 
Electors were selected through elections that were held between 16 and 30 April. Each municipality had two electors for every 100 inhabitants.

Results 
The election of Oberland's Landtag members and substitutes was held on 15 May in Vaduz. Of Oberland's 100 electors, 96 were present. Oberland elected seven Landtag members and four substitutes.

The election of Unterland's Landtag members and substitutes was held on 16 May in Mauren. All of Unterland's 60 electors were present. Unterland elected five Landtag members and two substitutes.

Rudolf Schädler declined his election as Oberland's substitute.

References 

Liechtenstein
1878 in Liechtenstein
Elections in Liechtenstein
May 1878 events